Al-Mansur Nasir al-Din Muhammad (1189 – after 1216) was the third Ayyubid Sultan of Egypt, reigning in 1198–1200.

Biography
The grandson of the Ayyubid dynasty's founder, Saladin, al-Mansur succeeded his father al-Aziz Uthman on the latter's death in 1198, at the age of twelve. A struggle subsequently ensued between different military factions as to who should serve as his atabeg al-asakir or commander in chief, and effective regent.  One faction, the Salahiyya or mamluks of Saladin, wanted Saladin's brother al-Adil to take on this role, as he was viewed as able and experienced. The other faction, the Asadiyya mamluks of Saladin's uncle Asad ad-Din Shirkuh favored Saladin's eldest son, al-Afdal.

In the struggle which followed al-Afdal had the initial advantage of being based in Egypt, while al-Adil was in Syria. Al-Afdal was duly proclaimed atabeg. War broke out between them and al-Afdal attacked Damascus, but he soon lost the advantage and in February 1200 (Rabi' II 596), al-Adil entered Cairo. Within days he had removed the name of al-Mansur in the Friday prayer khutbah and replaced it with his own, thereby deposing al-Mansur.

After his deposition al-Mansur was exiled to Aleppo in Syria. There, he lived in the court of his uncle, Emir az-Zahir Ghazi, who, in 1216, placed him in the line of succession for the emirate should his own sons predecease him. Nothing further is known of al-Mansur.

References

1189 births
13th-century deaths
12th-century Ayyubid sultans of Egypt
Ayyubid sultans of Egypt
Medieval child monarchs
12th-century Kurdish people